In algebra, the coimage of a homomorphism

is the quotient

of the domain by the kernel. 
The coimage is canonically isomorphic to the image by the first isomorphism theorem, when that theorem applies.

More generally, in category theory, the coimage of a morphism is the dual notion of the image of a morphism.

See also
Quotient object
Cokernel

References

Abstract algebra
Isomorphism theorems
Category theory

pl:Twierdzenie o izomorfizmie#Pierwsze twierdzenie